Gustav Tauschek (April 29, 1899, Vienna, Austria – February 14, 1945, Zürich, Switzerland) was an Austrian pioneer of Information technology and developed numerous improvements for punched card-based calculating machines from 1922 to 1945.

Biography
During the years 1926 – 1930 he worked for the 
Rheinische Metallwaren- und Maschinenfabrik (Rheinmetall) in Sömmerda, Germany, where he developed a complete punched card-based accounting system, which was never mass-produced. The prototype of that system is currently stored in the archives of the Vienna Technical Museum. 
In the spring of 1928, Rheinmetall created a subsidiary company that was assigned to develop new punched card-based machines. In the fall of the same year, the subsidiary was bought by IBM, thereby assuring its monopoly on the market. Tauschek was awarded a five-year contract and sold 169 patents to IBM in his lifetime.

Gustav Tauschek died of an embolism on February 14, 1945 in a hospital in Zürich, Switzerland.

Literature
Martin Helfert, Petra Mazuran, Christoph M. Wintersteiger: Gustav Tauschek und seine Maschinen, Linz: Trauner, 2007, in German. (Schriftenreihe Geschichte der Naturwissenschaften und der Technik; Bd. 10) 

Martin Helfert, Christoph M. Wintersteiger: Gustav Tauschek's Punchcard Accounting Machines, Proceedings of the Workshop on Methodic and Didactic Challenges of the History of Informatics (MEDICHI 2007), OCG 220, Austrian Computer Society, 2007.

External links
 
 ÖGIG Startseite at www.oegig.at Austrian Society for History of Informatics
 Technisches Museum Wien at www.tmw.at Vienna Technical Museum

20th-century Austrian inventors
Engineers from Vienna
1899 births
1945 deaths
Deaths from embolism